Ichibata Yakushi Kyōdan is an independent school of Buddhism in Japan which places great importance on what they term genze riyaku (faith) in Yakushi (Medicine Buddha). Previously affiliated with the Tendai and then the Myōshin-ji branch of Rinzai, today the school is still considered a part of the Rinzai despite having little in common with them. The school's various temples have become known as places where people can come to have their eyes healed. Its main temple is Ichibata Yakushi, and as of 1984 it had 31 temples with approximately 195,783 adherents.

See also
Buddhism in Japan

Notes

References

Schools of Buddhism founded in Japan
Rinzai school